XHVILL-FM is a radio station on 103.3 FM in Villahermosa, Tabasco.

History
XEVILL-AM 650 received its concession on December 13, 1988. It was owned by Alberto Guilbot Serros and soon after transferred to its current concessionaire.

XEVILL migrated to FM in 2010. For many years, it was operated by Grupo ACIR, last as "103.3 Noticias", one of the last news/talk stations owned by the group. The format came to an end on August 3, 2020, when ACIR's main news and sports programs for Villahermosa moved to XHSAT-FM 90.1.

References

Grupo ACIR
Radio stations in Tabasco